Pontygwaith Halt railway station served the village of Pontygwaith in South Wales. It was only open for nine years.

History and description
Located midway between Wattstown Platform and Tylorstown, the halt had a ground-level platform and an enclosure housing a shelter. The gates were kept locked until a train arrived and the conductor unlocked them. The halt closed in 1914.

After closure
Over a century after closure, there is little to show the existence of the halt. The site is little more than an open grassed space, grazed by sheep. The road bridge remains, though is now heavily defaced with graffiti.

References

Disused railway stations in Rhondda Cynon Taf
Former Taff Vale Railway stations
Railway stations in Great Britain opened in 1905
Railway stations in Great Britain closed in 1914